Mobius Mobius Mobius is a fictional character appearing in American comic books published by Marvel Comics. Various versions of Mobius from different points in time (and clones of him) make up the bureaucratic leadership and middle management of the timekeeping organization the Time Variance Authority, including Mr. Tesseract, Mr. Orobourous, and Mr. Paradox.

Mobius appears in the Marvel Cinematic Universe series Loki (2021) and in a post-credits scene cameo in the film Ant-Man and the Wasp: Quantumania (2023), portrayed by Owen Wilson.

Publication history

Mobius M. Mobius first appeared in Fantastic Four #353, cover date June 1991. Cloned managers for the Time Variance Authority that resemble Mark Gruenwald — and, later, Tom DeFalco — both longtime Marvel Comics writers. The most frequent recurring manager is Mobius M. Mobius, a Gruenwald clone.

Fictional character biography
Mobius M. Mobius is a bureaucrat and middle management for the Time Variance Authority, who attempted to discipline the Fantastic Four for violations of the TVA's laws.

Mr. Tesseract in Junior Management is a past version of and subordinate to Mobius; he was assigned to reconstruct the lost data from Earth-616. Justice Might, Justice Truth, and Justice Liberty are three officers who aided Mobius in recapturing the Fantastic Four while they were running loose inside the Null-Time Zone.

In other media

 Mobius M. Mobius appears in the Disney+ / Marvel Cinematic Universe (MCU) series Loki, portrayed by Owen Wilson. Like his comics counterpart, this version is a member of the Time Variance Authority (TVA). Series star Tom Hiddleston helped Wilson prepare for the role by explaining and showing him moments from the MCU, which Wilson felt was useful for when Mobius is interviewing Loki. Mobius' look in the series is meant to resemble Marvel Comics editor Mark Gruenwald, who was Marvel's "top continuity expert". Additionally, each member of the TVA was meant to be a clone of Gruenwald in the comics.
 Mobius makes a cameo appearance in the post-credits scene of the MCU film Ant-Man and the Wasp: Quantumania, portrayed again by an uncredited Owen Wilson.

References

External links

Characters created by Walt Simonson
Fantastic Four characters
Marvel Comics characters